North Dakota Highway 34 (ND 34) is a  east–west state highway in the U.S. state of North Dakota. ND 34's western terminus is at U.S. Route 83 (US 83) in Hazelton, and the eastern terminus is at ND 56 near Gackle.

Major intersections

References

External links

The North Dakota Highways Page by Chris Geelhart

034
Transportation in Emmons County, North Dakota
Transportation in Logan County, North Dakota